Bata is a village in the Panagyurishte municipality in western Bulgaria. It has 1 345 inhabitants.

Geography 
Bata is located in a mountainous region. The village lies in the Sredna Gora mountain, in the Bata-Banya valley. The river Banska Luda Yana runs through the village and flows in the Panagyurska Luda Yana slightly downstream. There are gold sands in the river between Bata and Popintsi which is at 9 km to the south. There are two micro dams in the land of the village suitable for fishing. A mineral spring exists in the locality Toplika.

The nearest settlements are the town of Panagyurishte at 8 km to the north and the village of Banya at 4 km to the east.

Culture and landmarks 
There are ruins of a medieval fortress in the vicinity called by the locals Krasen or Kaleto. Golden and silver jewels and coins dating from different periods have been found during excavations. 

Some authentic traditions have been preserved. The village has an amateur group called Iglika (cowslip) famous for the presentation of typical traditions, songs and dances with many awards from different fairs.

Events
 Kukeri - at Zagovezni
 Fair at St George's Day

People 
 Anelia Ralenkova - rhythmic gymnast with 4 gold medals from World and European Championships
 Dimitar Naydenov Dimitrov - sambo
 Ivan Shopov - sambo coach

External links 

 Radio and television in Bata and Banya
 Наблюдател
 Nature and climate
 Krasen

Notes 

Villages in Pazardzhik Province